A Roll-in is an advertisement or promotion that precedes core video or audio content presented in the same packaging as the core content. Roll-ins are being used increasingly as a method for getting advertising revenue from embeddable online content such as news and entertainment.

References 

Advertising techniques